Static Dress is an English rock band from Leeds, West Yorkshire. The band formed in 2018 and currently consists of vocalist Olli Appleyard, drummer Sam Ogden, bassist George Holding, and anonymous masked guitarist Contrast. They have released one full length studio album alongside various standalone singles and an EP.

History
The band was formed in 2018 by drummer Sam Kay, bassist Connor Reilly and guitarist Tom Black as well as vocalist Olli Appleyard, who had been working as a photographer and videographer for a number of bands. Appleyard, Reilly and Black had previously been involved with the band Galleries. At the time, Reilly had recently moved from Manchester to Leeds, which led the group to begin writing music in various different styles, trying to find their sound. The earliest sound the band began creating was hardcore punk, however no music from this period was released.

They released their debut single "Clean" on 16 August 2019. The single was accompanied by a music video directed by Appleyard and Kay. They made their live debut at the Glasgow practice room in on 3 October of the same year, opening for Decay. In the following days they also performed in Leeds and Liverpool. Soon after, they were asked to open for Dream State and Creeper on their own headline tours. On 28 November 2019, they released their second single "Adaptive Taste". From 6 February to 20 February 2020, the opened for Counterparts on their UK headline tour, alongside Can't Swim and Chamber. On the final date of the tour, they livestreamed a live performance, releasing it under the title "Time To Reset". On 14 April 2020, they released the single "Safeword", which was accompanied by a music video, filmed over FaceTime, due to the then-ongoing COVID-19 lockdown. On 11 July 2020, they released the single "Indecent". On 3 September 2020, they released the single "For the Attention of...". On 20 June 2021, they performed at the Download Festival pilot, and the 2021 Slam Dunk Festival in September. Between 28 October and 6 November 2021, they opened for Yours Truly on their UK headline tour alongside Wargasm. On 4 June 2021, they release the single "Sweet."
Prior to the release of 'sweet.', Black and Kay departed from the group, leading to the recruitment of anonymous guitarist Contrast and drummer Sam Ogden. November 2 to 20, they toured supporting Higher Power on their UK headline tour. On 5 November 2021, they released the single "Sober Exit(s)", and announced that the single would be a part of their debut EP "Prologue...". The EP was released on 3 December 2021, coinciding with the release of a companion comic book illustrated by Tanya Kenny and written by Appleyard. In December 2020 they opened for Creeper on their UK headline tour alongside Holding Absence and Wargasm. On 6 January 2022, they released the single "Di-sinTer" featuring King Yosef. In February 2022, they opened for Knocked Loose and Terror on their UK co-headline tour. On 14 February, they announced that their debut album Rouge Carpet Disaster would be released on 18 May. On 23 February, they released the single "Such a Shame" and announced their debut UK headline would take place between 10 and 16 April. On 20 April, they released the single "Fleahouse".
Bassist Connor Reilly announced his departure from the band in 2023 citing personal issues via a statement on Instagram.

Artistry

Musical style
The band's music has been categorised as post-hardcore, metalcore, screamo and emo. They often make use of elements of alternative rock, electronic music, punk rock and nu metal,and produce ambient tracks as a means of world building. PopMatters cited them as a frontrunner of the "scene metalcore revival", while Revolver cited them as a part of the "post-hardcore revival". In a 2021 interview with The Line of Best Fit, when asked about the band's categorisations and comparisons, Appleyard stated "I look at these scene bands we're compared to and I’m like... If you like that, you’ll like this – but I wouldn’t say it’s derived from it".

Revolver magazine writer Eli Enis stated that they use a "push-pull between strained screams and eye-lined pop-punk hooks, Static Dress tickle the Y2K nostalgia senses without falling victim to pure homage". Rock Sound writer Jack Roger stated that they make use of "gorgeous choruses, corrosive riffs and a truly infectious atmosphere". DeadPress writer Michael Heath described their sound as "2000s tinged yet experimental brand of post-hardcore". Upset magazine said they have "a frenetic sound that is rooted in late 00s post-hardcore and emo akin to Underoath, Emery and My Chemical Romance... with its cinematic and cryptographic undertones, it becomes apparent that there is a mastermind creating a narrative within both the music and their visual counterparts" Underground Under Dogs writer Mike Giegerich stated that "Olli Appleyard is meticulous in crafting his band’s expansive palette, intentionally avoiding contemporary influences for distinctly original worldbuilding. His approach shines through as Static Dress define their own point of view within the broader context of alternative sounds, existing in a space where free-time ambient and poetic post-hardcore are able to thrive simultaneously".

Imagery and worldbuilding
Kerrang! writer Mischa Pearlman described as "a vivid alternate universe centred around a semi-fictionalised version of [Appleyard]." Both the band's lyrics and imagery follow overarching storylines, which Appleyard has stated he "never want[s] to allow to cross paths". The majority of their earliest songs were accompanied by music videos, that make use of reoccurring imagery. Several of the music videos all take place in the same room with striped green and white wallpaper and a red rotary phone. The band's livestreamed and recorded performances through 2020 and 2021, included QR codes which linked to Dropbox folders containing bonus content.

The music videos from Prologue... are part of a "spin-off" of the original storyline, where the characters are looking at themselves and reflecting on "what could have been". The EP released alongside a comic book illustrated by Tanya Kenny and written by Appleyard. The comic book and song storylines take place directly before the events of 'Rouge Carpet Disaster'. Its cassette included a second side containing an audio commentary of the tracks on the soundtrack. An earlier version of the EP was also distributed at Slam Dunk festival 2021 which included multiple "mysteries for people to solve". This version was never intended for mainstream release.

Appleyard has cited influences on the band's imagery as including Floria Sigismondi, Tim Burton, James Wan and the Cell.

Members
Current members
Olli Appleyard – lead vocals 
Sam Ogden – drums 
Contrast – guitar 
George Holding - bass, backing vocals 

Former members
Tom Black – guitar 
Sam Kay – drums 
Connor Reilly – bass, backing vocals

Discography
Albums
 Rouge Carpet Disaster (2022)

EPs
 Prologue... (2021) 

Demos
 TBC (2021) 

Singles

Music videos

Accolades

References

Musical groups from Leeds
Musical groups established in 2018
English metalcore musical groups
British emo musical groups
British post-hardcore musical groups